Fribourg Olympic Basket, commonly known as Fribourg Olympic, is a Swiss professional basketball club that is based in Fribourg. Due to name sponsorship reasons, the former name of the club was Benetton Fribourg. The club is a seventeen-time Swiss Basketball League champion.

History
Fribourg Olympic competed in seven seasons of the original version of the EuroLeague, the top-level European competition, when it was run by FIBA, due to being the Swiss League champions. In all those seasons, the club only qualified two times for the competition's second round, by winning their previous series. In 2007, Fribourg Olympic competed in the European-wide secondary competition, the 2007–08 ULEB Cup regular season, but they ended up in the last position of their group.

In the 2015–16 season, Fribourg won its first Swiss Basketball League (SBL) title in eight years. In the 2017–18 season, Fribourg won its seventeenth Swiss national title. Following that domestic title, the club made its debut in the qualifying rounds of the European secondary level FIBA Basketball Champions League (BCL). On 4 October 2018, they eventually qualified to the competition's regular season phase, after winning three successive qualifying rounds against Avtodor Saratov, Donar, and Sakarya.

Arena
Fribourg Olympic plays its home games at the Salle Saint-Léonard arena, which has a seating capacity of 2,850 people.

Honours and titles 
Swiss Basketball League
 Champions (18): 1966, 1971, 1973, 1974, 1978, 1979, 1981, 1982, 1985, 1992, 1997, 1998, 1999, 2007, 2008, 2016, 2018, 2019, 2021, 2022
Runners-up (17): 1965, 1967, 1968, 1969, 1972, 1976, 1977, 1983, 1989, 1994, 1995, 1996, 2002, 2003, 2004, 2010, 2011
Swiss Cup
 Winners (9): 1967, 1976, 1978, 1997, 1998, 2007, 2016, 2018, 2019
Swiss League Cup
Winners (6): 2007, 2008, 2009, 2010, 2018, 2020

Roster

Notable players

Head coaches
 Ed Klimkowski
 Petar Aleksic

References

External links 
Fribourg Olympic Website (French)
Presentation at EuroBasket.com

1961 establishments in Switzerland
Basketball teams established in 1961
Basketball teams in Switzerland
Fribourg